The Wharton Range is a mountain range in Papua New Guinea.

See also
Wharton Range languages

References

Mountain ranges of Papua New Guinea